KCIX (105.9 FM, "Mix 106") is a commercial radio station located in Garden City, Idaho, broadcasting to the Boise, Idaho, area.  KCIX airs a hot adult contemporary music format.

Personalities
Chris and Ryan in the Morning took over weekday morning duties (5AM-10AM) on the station in September of 2021. The show features segments with live callers, local content, and lifestyle topics.
The morning drive show is followed by middays with Deanna from 10AM to 2PM before Marco takes over in afternoon drive from 2PM to 7PM.
At 7PM, Pop Crush Nights with Donny Meacham airs which features celebrity gossip and pop culture news. Lauryn Snapp hosts weekend duties.
KCIX's traffic team consists of Dave Burnett and Robin Scott.

History
KCIX was originally branded as K-106 with an Adult Contemporary format including songs from the '60s, '70s, '80s, and the '90s.  By the later 1990s, the station moved in a Hot AC direction.  In 1999, KCIX rebranded as Mix 106, and shifted away songs from the '60s and '70s to focus more on the '80s and '90s.

On November 16, 2006, Clear Channel Communications planned to sell 448 of its radio stations outside the top 100 markets including KCIX, along with Boise's sister stations including KSAS-FM, KTMY (now KAWO), KXLT-FM, KIDO, and KFXD. In March 2007, Peak Broadcasting LLC bought the latter stations, making Boise one of the largest markets without any radio stations owned by the future iHeartMedia.

In 2011, Mix 106 silently began adding more contemporary pop currents, moving the station in an Adult Top 40 direction.

On August 30, 2013, a deal was announced in which Townsquare Media would purchase Peak Broadcasting's stations, including KCIX. The deal was part of Cumulus Media's acquisition of Dial Global; Townsquare swapped Peak's Fresno, California stations to Cumulus for its stations in Dubuque, Iowa and Poughkeepsie, New York, and Peak, Townsquare, and Dial Global were all controlled by Oaktree Capital Management. The sale to Townsquare was completed on November 14, 2013.

References

External links
KCIX official website

CIX
Hot adult contemporary radio stations in the United States
Radio stations established in 1985
Townsquare Media radio stations
1985 establishments in Idaho